The Jakarta–Serpong Toll Road, also known as Ulujami–Serpong Toll Road, is a toll road connecting South Jakarta and South Tangerang (mainly BSD City and Bintaro Jaya) in the province of Banten, Indonesia. Operated by Jasa Marga and Nusantara Infrastructure, this toll road is connected to the Jakarta Outer Ring Road in Ulujami and Petukangan areas.

2022 Flood
The toll road was flooded due to heavy rain over South Tangerang on 4 October 2022, leading to this toll road inaccessible for traffic. It is argued that the flood happened due to lack of water storage and the narrowing of Cibenda River. The Ministry of Public Works along with PT Bumi Serpong Damai as the operator of this toll road built a retention pond to overcome the flooding, then raised the road height until 2 meters on KM 7 and cleaned river sediments in the cross-drain area.

Exits

See also

 Transport in Indonesia

References

External links
PT Jasa Marga website

Toll roads in Indonesia
Transport in Jakarta